A bacteriologist is a microbiologist, or similarly trained professional, in bacteriology -- a subdivision of microbiology that studies bacteria, typically pathogenic ones. Bacteriologists are interested in studying and learning about bacteria, as well as using their skills in clinical settings. This includes investigating properties of bacteria such as morphology, ecology, genetics and biochemistry, phylogenetics, genomics and many other areas related to bacteria like disease diagnostic testing. Alongside human and animal healthcare providers, they may carry out various functions as medical scientists, veterinary scientists, or diagnostic technicians in locations like clinics, blood banks, hospitals, laboratories and animal hospitals. Bacteriologists working in public health or biomedical research help develop vaccines for public use.

Bacteriologist specializations 

 Pathology
 Immunology
 Cell Biology
 Medical Laboratory Science
 Biomedical Research
 Health Technology
 Veterinary Bacteriology
 Biosecurity
 Research
 Epidemiology
 Agriculture
 Food Safety
 Bacterial Evolution and Systematics
 Phylogenetics and Taxonomy
 Ecology

Education 
Because bacteriology is a sub-field of microbiology, most careers in bacteriology require an undergraduate degree in microbiology or a closely related field. Graduate degrees in microbiology or disciplines like it are common for bacteriologists because graduate degree programs provide more in-depth and specific education on topics related to bacteriology. They also often include research and lab experience. Graduate studies also provide opportunities for practical experience in applying bacteriological concepts to a work environment. If someone wants to pursue independent research or desires to work in a university research facility, they will have to complete a PhD in bacteriology or a similar field.

Noted bacteriologists

See also 
 Bacteriology
 Microbiologist
 Bacteria
 Pathogenic Bacteria
 Human Disease

References

 
 
Science occupations
Microbiologists